Stephenson Bastion is a mountain massif with steep rock cliffs on its south side, rising to 1,850 m in the south-central part of Shackleton Range. It was first mapped in 1957 by the Commonwealth Trans-Antarctic Expedition, and it was photographed by U.S. Navy aircraft in 1967. It was named by the United Kingdom Antarctic Place-Names Committee (UK-APC) for Philip J. Stephenson, an Australian geologist with the transpolar party of the CTAE in 1956–58.

On its east side, a prominent rock bluff was given the name Ram Bow Bluff because of the feature's resemblance to the ram bow of an old battleship.

References

Mountains of Coats Land